The 2003 Nigerian Senate election in Ekiti State was held on April 12, 2003, to elect members of the Nigerian Senate to represent Ekiti State. Clement Awoyelu representing Ekiti Central and Bode Olowoporoku representing Ekiti South won on the platform of Peoples Democratic Party, while James Kolawole representing Ekiti North won on the platform of the Alliance for Democracy.

Overview

Summary

Results

Ekiti Central 
The election was won by Clement Awoyelu of the Peoples Democratic Party.

Ekiti South 
The election was won by Bode Olowoporoku of the Peoples Democratic Party.

Ekiti North 
The election was won by James Kolawole of the Alliance for Democracy.

References 

April 2003 events in Nigeria
Ekiti State Senate elections
Eki